Steve Tanner may refer to:

 Steve Tanner (referee) (born 1970), British football referee
 Steve Tanner (Coronation Street), a former character in British soap Coronation Street

See also 
 Stephen Tanner, American author
 Stephen J. Tanner, Canadian police chief